Futa may refer to:

Geography
Futa Pass between Florence and Bologna
Futa River in Chile
Futa, Ghana, a community in Ghana
Futa Tooro, a region along the Senegal River

Acronyms
Federal Unemployment Tax Act (US)
Federal University of Technology Akure in Nigeria

People
André-Philippe Futa
Futa Helu
Yasunosuke Futa

Other
Fouta towel or futa towel, a piece of cloth worn in a skirt-like fashion in certain countries
Futa (red panda), a famous standing Japanese red panda
Futa, an abbreviation for futanari, the Japanese word for hermaphroditism and a genre of pornography

See also
Fouta (disambiguation)